Crapo may refer to:

People with the surname
 Henry H. Crapo (1804–1869), American politician (Governor of Michigan)
 Henry H. Crapo (1932–2019), American-Canadian mathematician
 Mike Crapo (born 1951), American politician (Senator from Idaho)
 Terry Crapo (1939–1982), American politician, brother of Mike Crapo
 William W. Crapo (1830–1926), American politician (member of the House of Representatives from Massachusetts)
 William Crapo Durant (1861–1947), American businessman and founder of General Motors

Places
 Crapo Park, a city park in Burlington, Iowa, United States
 Crapo, Maryland, an unincorporated community, United States

See also
 Crépeau (disambiguation)